ETEC may refer to:
Enterotoxigenic Escherichia coli, a bacterium
Energy Technology Engineering Center, a nuclear engineering complex in California
Etec Systems, Inc., a technology company
Escadron de transport, d'entrainement et de calibration, a unit of the French Air Force
E-TEC II, a car engine
ETEC Lauro Gomes, an educational facility located in São Bernardo do Campo, SP, Brazil